Abdul Moktar Dialo (born December 23, 1985, in Ouagadougou, Burkina Faso) is a footballer.

Career 

His career began in Europe in 2005 at the age of 20 when he signed a professional contract with Panthrakikos F.C. He was a member of Panthrakikos U21 in the 2005–06 season with a remarkable performance. In the 2006 he was promoted to the first squad. In the following four years he participated in Beta Ethniki, Super League Greece and Cypriot First Division.

Career statistics

Last update: 28 June 2010

References

External links

Panthraxstats
Profile at guardian stats centre

1985 births
Living people
Burkinabé footballers
Burkina Faso international footballers
Burkinabé expatriate footballers
Sportspeople from Ouagadougou
Association football forwards
Super League Greece players
Cypriot First Division players
Panthrakikos F.C. players
Expatriate footballers in Greece
Ionikos F.C. players
Kallithea F.C. players
AEP Paphos FC players
Expatriate footballers in Cyprus
21st-century Burkinabé people